Marsassoum is a small town and seat of the Marsassoum Arrondissement in the Ziguinchor Region of Senegal, roughly  from Ziguinchor. It lies on the bank of the Soungrougrou River. In 2002 it had a population of 6410 people.

History
During colonial times it was a centre of the slave trade. Children could be sold from 200 to 250 francs. Today there are significant populations of Mandinka people living in the vicinity.

On July 28, 2008, gendarmes opened fire on 10 demonstrators who had barricaded the roads in Marsassoum.

Notable people
Karamba Diaby (1961-)

References

Populated places in the Ziguinchor Department
Communes of Senegal